The Circuit of the Fruit Region was a men's cycling race organized for the last time in 1976. The start and finish place was Alken (Limburg, Belgium), except in 1968 when the event was organized in Hasselt.

The competition's roll of honor includes the successes of Rik Van Looy and Walter Godefroot.

Winners

References 

Cycle races in Belgium
1955 establishments in Belgium
Defunct cycling races in Belgium
Recurring sporting events established in 1955
Recurring sporting events disestablished in 1976
1976 disestablishments